This article lists diplomatic missions resident in Portugal. At present, the capital city of Lisbon hosts 88 embassies. In addition are consulates in Porto and other major cities. As Lisbon is also the seat of the Community of Portuguese Language Countries (CPLP), a few of the organization's member-states maintain permanent missions to it, separate from their respective embassies.

Several countries have ambassadors accredited to Portugal, with most being resident in Paris, since Portugal doesn't accept accreditation from ambassadors based in Madrid.

This listing omits honorary consulates.

Diplomatic missions in Lisbon

Other delegations, missions and consulates-general in Lisbon

Consulates in Portugal

Permanent Missions to the CPLP

Non-resident embassies 

Resident in Brussels, Belgium

 
 
 
 

Resident in London, United Kingdom

 

 

Resident in Paris, France

 

 

 

Resident in Rome, Italy

Resident elsewhere

 (Rabat)
 (The Hague)
 (The Hague)
 (Rabat)
 (Geneva)
 (Bern)
 (New York City)
 (Tallinn)
 (Podgorica)
 (Ljubljana)
 (San Marino)

Closed missions

See also 
 Foreign relations of Portugal
 List of diplomatic missions of Portugal

Notes

References

External links 
 Portuguese Ministry of Foreign Affairs

List
Portugal
Diplomatic missions
Community of Portuguese Language Countries